Battle of Kaliakra can refer to one  of two following battles that took place off Cape Kaliakra, in modern Bulgaria:

 Battle of Cape Kaliakra (1791), between the Ottomans and the Russians
 Battle of Kaliakra (1912), between the  Bulgarians and Ottomans